Many Arabs in Iraq identify strongly with a tribe (العشيرة 'ashira). 30 of the 150 or so identifiable tribes of Iraq are the most influential.  Tribes are grouped into federations (qabila).  Below the tribe, there are the clan (الفخذ fukhdh), the house (البيت beit) and the extended family (الخمس khams). On its accession to power in the 17 July Revolution of 1968, the Ba'ath Party announced its opposition to tribalism ( القبلية al-qabaliyya), although for pragmatic reasons, especially during the war with Iran, tribalism was sometimes tolerated and even encouraged.

List of major tribes ('ashira) 
 
 Banu Khuza'ah
 Shammar
 Al-Dulaimi
 Al-Jubouri
 Al-Aniza
 Al-Asadi
 Al-Ali
 Al-Duraji
 Bani Hasan
 Al-Khazraj
 Banu Lam
 Bani Malik
 Al-Muntafiq
 Al-Bu Nasir
 Al-Dhafeer
 Al-Musawi
 Al-Ubaid
 Otaibah
 Al-Zubaidi
 Mutair
 Banu Tamim
 Banu Kilab
 Banu Asad

Partial source: Tribes in Iraq, Humanitarian Information Centre for Iraq. 2003.

See also
Iraqis
Arabs

References 

Tripp, Charles (2000) A History of Iraq. Cambridge University Press. /
Al-Azzawi, Abbas. Asha'ir al-Iraq (The Tribes of Iraq). Baghdad Press, Iraq.
Al-Amiri, Thamir. "Mawsu'at al-Qaba'il al-Iraqiyya" (The Encyclopedia of Iraqi Tribes). 9 vols. Baghdad, 1991–1997.
Al-Samarra'i, Younis Al-Sheikh Ibrahim. Al-Qaba'il al-Iraqiyya (Iraqi Tribes). Al-Sharaf Al-Jedid Press, Baghdad, Iraq.
Al-Samarra'i, Younis Al-Sheikh Ibrahim. Al-Qaba'il wa al-Biyoutat al-Hashimiya fi al-Iraq (Hashimi Tribes and Families in Iraq). Al-Umma Press, Baghdad.
Al-Durubi, Ibrahim. Al-Baghdadiyun, Akhbaruhum wa Majalisuhum (The Baghdadis, Their Annals and Assemblies). Al-Rabita Press, Baghdad, 1958.
ath-Thuroihi, Abdul Maula. (Ar-Riyaadh al-Azhariyyah Fii Taariikh al-Usor al-‘Alawiyyah)

Arab groups
Arabs in Iraq